Sandra Lynn "Sam" Sorbo (née Jenkins; born October 18, 1964) is an American actress. She played Serena in the television series Hercules: The Legendary Journeys and hosts the weekday, syndicated radio program, The Sam Sorbo Show.

Career 
Under her maiden name, Jenkins, Sorbo played Serena on the TV series Hercules: The Legendary Journeys. In the show, Hercules falls in love with Sorbo's character and they get married, but Serena dies under mysterious circumstances.

Sorbo starred as Dr. Caroline Eggert in the third season of Chicago Hope and alongside Steve Buscemi in Twenty Bucks and Ed and His Dead Mother. She had guest appearances as Mariah on seaQuest DSV and she acted alongside her husband as Dr. Sara Riley, Dylan Hunt's former fiancee, in two episodes of Andromeda.

Under her married name, Sorbo hosts a weekday radio show, The Sam Sorbo Show, syndicated nationwide by Mojo 5-0 Radio. She also co-hosts Flashpoint Live, a weekly radio news magazine.

Personal life 
Sorbo studied Biomedical Engineering at Duke University, but decided to pursue modeling and acting afterwards.
Sorbo married actor Kevin Sorbo on January 5, 1998.  They met the previous year when she had a small recurring role on Hercules (Season 3, Episode 8 "Prince Hercules"). They have three children: Braeden Cooper (born 2001), Shane Haaken (born 2004), and Octavia Flynn (born 2005); whom they homeschooled. Sorbo is the spokesman and chair of A World Fit for Kids! (AWFFK!), a non-profit organization that trains teenagers to become mentors to younger children. Sorbo wrote They're Your Kids, a book that chronicles her family's experience with homeschooling. She publicly advocates homeschooling.

Politics 
Sorbo has been a featured speaker on the ReAwaken America Tour.

Filmography

References

External links 

1964 births
Actresses from Pittsburgh
American film actresses
American television actresses
Duke University Pratt School of Engineering alumni
Homeschooling advocates
Living people
21st-century American women